The Ladbrokes Gold Cup is a greyhound competition held at Monmore Green Stadium. It was revived in 1994 and was originally known as the Midland Gold Cup. 

Winners have included the 1998 English Greyhound Derby champion Toms The Best and the 2011 English Greyhound Derby winner Taylors Sky.

Past winners

Venues 
1994–present (Monmore 480m)

Sponsors
2014–present Ladbrokes

References

Greyhound racing competitions in the United Kingdom
Sport in Wolverhampton
Recurring sporting events established in 1994